Beginning on 24 December 2021, record rainfall across the northeastern Brazilian state Bahia have resulted in severe floods. 21 people were killed, while 358 were injured and 62,800 were displaced. In a tweet, Rui Costa, the Governor of Bahia, declared the floods to be "the worst disaster that has ever occurred in the history of Bahia". 72 municipalities of Bahia declared a state of emergency.

Total rainfall at the state capital Salvador during December exceeded  on 24 December, five times the historic average. On 26 December, the Bahia state government and Brazilian federal government, along with cooperation from other state governments, mounted a joint rescue operation to victims at the affected areas. Two dams collapsed between 25 and 26 December, at Jussiape and Itambé respectively. The town of Vitória da Conquista was heavily affected.

Southern Bahia had been badly flooded earlier the same month by Subtropical Storm Ubá.

COVID-19 medicines and vaccines were destroyed by the flooding.

See also
Weather of 2021
List of deadliest floods
2020 Brazilian floods and mudslides

References

2021 floods in Brazil
2021 meteorology
Late December 2021 floods
December 2021 events in Brazil